Maria Sharapova was the two-time defending champion, but lost in the semifinals to Jamea Jackson.

Vera Zvonareva won the title, defeating Jackson in the final 7–6(14–12), 7–6(7–5).

Seeds
A champion seed is indicated in bold text while text in italics indicates the round in which that seed was eliminated. The top eight seeds received a bye to the second round.

Draw

Finals

Top half

Section 1

Section 2

Bottom half

Section 3

Section 4

References
2006 DFS Classic Draw

DFS Classic Singles
Singles